Space Center Houston is a science museum that serves as the official visitor center of NASA Johnson Space Center in Houston. It was designated a Smithsonian Affiliate museum in 2014. The organization is owned by NASA, and operated under a contract by the nonprofit Manned Spaceflight Education Foundation, a 501(c)(3) organization. The Johnson Space Center is the home of Mission Control and astronaut training.

The center opened in 1992 replacing the former Visitor Center in Johnson Space Center Building 2.

Starship gallery
This artifact gallery includes three flown spacecraft, several used in training, and a display of Moon rocks:
 Mercury 9 capsule (Faith 7) flown by Gordon Cooper in 1963
 Gemini 5 capsule flown by Gordon Cooper and Pete Conrad in 1965
 Apollo 17 Command Module America flown by Gene Cernan, Ronald Evans, and Dr. Harrison "Jack" Schmitt, along with a biological contingent of five mice, orbited the Moon a record 75 times in 1971 during the last crewed Lunar mission
 Lunar Module test vehicle LTA-8
 Lunar Roving Vehicle Trainer
 Lunar Samples Vault
 Lunar touchstone, one of only eight Moon rocks in the world that can be touched
 Skylab 1-G Trainer
 Apollo-Soyuz Test Project docking module trainer

Independence Plaza

Space Center Houston is the home of the Independence Plaza exhibit complex. This attraction contains the world's only Space Shuttle replica, where it stands mounted on one of the two original shuttle carrier aircraft. Independence Plaza is the only place where the public can enter both vehicles. The Space Shuttle replica Independence, formerly known as Explorer, was previously located at Kennedy Space Center Visitor Complex, but was moved to make way for a new permanent attraction hall for Space Shuttle Atlantis. Independence is now displayed atop the retired Shuttle Carrier Aircraft, NASA 905. On August 14, 2014, a heavy lift called The Rise of Independence was completed to place Independence on top of NASA 905. The plane was transported to Space Center Houston from Ellington Airport on April 30, 2014. 

Space Center Houston was briefly considered as a home for one of the retired Space Shuttle orbiters, but the Kennedy Space Center Visitor Complex, Intrepid Sea, Air and Space Museum, and California Science Center were instead selected. A NASA report showing the final scoring showed Space Center Houston finished 10th among 13 museums competing for the three orbiters (not already committed to the Smithsonian Air and Space Museum).

Rocket Park
Of the three remaining Saturn V rockets on display, only the one at the Johnson Space Center is made up of segments originally intended for flight. The first stage of this Saturn V rocket is from SA-514 (originally intended for the cancelled Apollo 19), the second stage from SA-515 (originally intended for the cancelled Apollo 20), and the third stage from SA-513, which was not needed after it was replaced by the Skylab workshop. SA-513 was originally scheduled for the cancelled Apollo 18 – the rest of the rocket was used for Skylab. The Apollo Command/Service Module CSM-115a (intended for Apollo 19) completes the rocket as it would stand on the launchpad.

The Saturn V, on loan from the Smithsonian, was displayed outside the Johnson Space Center main entrance from 1977 through 2004. Grants from the National Park Service's Save America's Treasures program, the National Trust for Historic Preservation and private contributors funded the restoration by Conservation Solutions of Washington DC with oversight by the Smithsonian.

An open air tram tour takes the general public into the Johnson Space Center with stops including building 30 (location of the Historic Mission Operations Control Room 2 and the Christopher C. Kraft Jr. Mission Control Center), Building 9 (location of the Space Vehicle Mockup Facility) and Rocket Park with a restored Saturn V rocket.

Mission Mars
The exhibit Mission Mars opened in January 2017 and was developed with the help of NASA. It focuses on the work NASA is doing now to plan for future travel to Mars. Mission Mars teaches visitors about the planet through a variety of activities that transport them to the Martian landscape, including a virtual reality wall, real-time weather forecasts, and a Mars meteorite that guests can touch. Visitors can also see a full-size Orion research capsule, experience an Orion spacecraft simulator, and get a look at the next generation of Mars rovers.

Other attractions

The Astronaut Gallery showcases a comprehensive collection of spacesuits, including Pete Conrad's Apollo 12 moonwalk suit.
The lectern that President John F. Kennedy used during his 1962 Rice University Stadium speech reiterating his goal to land an American on the Moon in the 1960s, is exhibited inside Destiny Theater.
The Space Center Theater is a five-story tall 4K resolution theater that shows EVA 23 and Mission Control: The Unsung Heroes of Apollo.
The Destiny Theater has a HD digital screen and shows a short historical film, Human Destiny, produced by Bob Rogers and BRC Imagination Arts.
The live interactive performance Living in Space, produced by Bob Rogers and BRC Imagination Arts, employs projection mapping technology to assist with the live onstage presentation of daily life on the International Space Station.
A live program that lets guests become rocket scientists through interactive experiments performed by a center Crew Member.
The Mission Briefing Center features live presentations offering real-time updates on current NASA missions.
International Space Station Gallery provides a look inside the space station.
Talon Park has a pair of NASA T-38 Talon jets greeting visitors at the street entrance to the Space Center Houston campus.

Education
The Manned Space Flight Education Foundation's education department at Space Center Houston is among the nation's leading science-education resources. The programs are based on national science standards and focus on interactive science, technology, and engineering and math (STEM) activities to inspire learning and develop problem-solving and critical-thinking skills for all ages, especially as related to human spaceflight and exploration. Programs include:

 Day camps
 Distance learning
 Field trips
 Girls STEM Academy
 Home School Days
 Overnight experiences
 Scout Camp-Ins
 Sensory Friendly Evenings
 Space Center U
 Space Exploration Educators Conference
 Stars & STEM
 Team building for corporations

Gallery

References

External links

Space Center Houston Official Site
Johnson Space Center Official Site

NASA groups, organizations, and centers
Aerospace museums in Texas
Museums in Houston
Science museums in Texas
Tourist attractions in Houston
NASA visitor centers
Johnson Space Center